Media Watch or MediaWatch may refer to:

 Media Watch (TV program), an Australian television program
 Media Watch International, a United States-based lobby group
 Mediawatch-UK, a United Kingdom-based lobby group
 A segment on the Australian television program Hey Hey It's Saturday

See also 
 Arab Media Watch
 Palestine Media Watch
 Palestinian Media Watch
 Trans Media Watch (TMW), a British charity
 Watchdog journalism (Media watch group)